Karmilio Oros ( or ; also known as Prophet Elijah or Profitis Ilias (Προφήτης Ηλίας) on some maps) is a peak at the southern end of the Athos peninsula. Its summit is 887 metres above sea level. It is named after Mount Carmel.

The peak can be reached via footpaths from the Hermitage of Saint Basil. The peak lies directly to the northeast of the Skete of St. Basil. The Holy Chapel of the Holy Glorious Prophet Elijah (Ιερόν Παρεκκλήσιον Αγίου ενδόξου Προφήτου Ηλιού) and some radio towers sit on top of the peak. A footpath connects the skete to the peak, as well as with the Stavros junction, where there are footpaths that lead to the Skete of St. Anne, Kerasia, and Great Lavra.

References

Mount Athos
Landforms of Chalkidiki
Mountains of Central Macedonia
Mountains associated with Byzantine monasticism
Mountains associated with Christian monasticism